Rebel Without a Crew (subtitle: Or How a 23-Year-Old Filmmaker with $7,000 Became a Hollywood Player) is a 1995 non-fiction book by Robert Rodriguez. Presented in a diary format, Rebel details Rodriguez's beginnings as a young filmmaker, his stint at a medical testing facility to raise money for a feature film, the making of that film (El Mariachi) for $7,000, and his subsequent experiences in Hollywood selling the film and going to film festivals promoting it.

Later editions of the book also feature one of Rodriguez's tutorials on low-budget filmmaking (Ten Minute Film School) and the screenplay to El Mariachi.

Influence 
Rodriguez' rags-to-riches story, detailed in Rebel, as well as his vociferous support of low-budget techniques (such as digital cinematography) to allow anyone to make a movie cheaply, have made him an icon of modern independent filmmaking.

Film adaptation 
The book was loosely adapted in the 2019 film Red 11, which was written and directed by Rodriguez.

References

1995 non-fiction books
Books about film
Mexico Trilogy
Show business memoirs